Lenore Jackson Coffee (July 13, 1896 – July 2, 1984) was an American screenwriter, playwright, and novelist.

Biography
Lenore Jackson Coffee was born in San Francisco in 1896 to Andrew Jackson Coffee Jr. and Ella Muffley. She attended Dominican College in San Rafael, California. 
She began her career answering an ad requesting a screen story for the actress Clara Kimball Young and was awarded a one-year contract at $50 a week.

She was twice nominated for an Academy Award for Best Adapted Screenplay. The first time was for Street of Chance in 1929/30, adapted from the story by Oliver H. P. Garrett, in collaboration with Howard Estabrook; and the second was with Julius J. Epstein in 1938 for Four Daughters, based on Fannie Hurst's short story Sister Act.

Of the studio system, she is quoted as saying:
"They pick your brains, break your heart, ruin your digestion – and what do you get for it? Nothing but a lousy fortune."

Coffee wrote many stories related to experiences women faced during her time, yet they were not often met with commercial success. Coffee spent many years with Warner Bros., which she mentions in her autobiography as to being the only female writer. One hit that came out of that is the film Four Daughters, which she co-wrote with Julius J. Epstein.

Coffee was married to writer-director William J. Cowen (1886–1964), with whom she wrote Family Portrait: A Play in Three Acts (1939). It was performed at the Morosco Theatre on Broadway from March 8 – June, 1939; and the Strand Theatre in the West End, in February 1948. On April 10, 1955, a TV adaptation aired as an episode of the BBC Sunday Night Theatre series.

Bibliography
Family Portrait: A Play in Three Acts (1939) with William J. Cowen; adapted for TV in 1955
The Face of Love (1950) novel
Another Time, Another Place (1955) novel, published in England as Weep No More; filmed in 1958
Storyline: Recollections of a Hollywood Screenwriter (1973) memoir

Further reading
“Lenore Coffee: Easy Smiler, Easy Weeper” interview in Backstory: Interviews with Screenwriters of Hollywood’s Golden Age (1986) pp. 133-150, ed. Patrick McGilligan. Berkeley: University of California Press.
"Shaping the Craft of Screenwriting: Women Screen Writers in Silent Era Hollywood" (2017) essay by Donna Casella

Film credits

 The Better Wife (1919; screenplay) 
 The Forbidden Woman (1920; story)
 For the Soul of Rafael (1920; uncredited)
 The Fighting Shepherdess (1920; uncredited)
 Alias Ladyfingers (1921; adaptation)
 Hush (1921; uncredited)
 The Right That Failed (1922; adaptation)
 Sherlock Brown (1922; writer)
 The Face Between (1922; writer)
 Thundering Dawn (1923; screenplay; story)
 Daytime Wives (1923; story)
 Temptation (1923; story)
 The Age of Desire (1923; titles)
 Wandering Daughters (1923; titles)
 The Six-Fifty (1923; unconfirmed)
 Strangers of the Night (1923; uncredited)
 The Dangerous Age (1923; uncredited)
 The Meanest Man in the World (1923; adaptation)
 The Rose of Paris (1924; adaptation)
 Bread (1924; writer)
 Fools' Highway (1924; writer)
 Hell's Highroad (1925; adaptation)
 Graustark (1925; uncredited)
 The Swan (1925; uncredited)
 The Great Divide (1925; uncredited)
 East Lynne (1925; writer)
 The Volga Boatman (1926; adaptation)
 For Alimony Only (1926; screenplay) 
 The Winning of Barbara Worth (1926; uncredited)
 The Night of Love (1927; adapted screenplay)
 Chicago (1927; screenplay)
 The Angel of Broadway (1927; screenplay)
 Lonesome Ladies (1927; story)
 The Love of Sunya (1927; uncredited)
 Ned McCobb's Daughter (1928; uncredited)
 Desert Nights (1929; continuity) 
 Mothers Cry (1930; screen version)
 Street of Chance (1930; writer)
 The Bishop Murder Case (1930; writer)
 Possessed (1931; adaptation and dialogue continuity) 
 The Squaw Man (1931; screenplay) 
 Honor of the Family (1931; writer)
 Arsène Lupin (1932; dialogue) 
 Downstairs (1932; screenplay) 
 Rasputin and the Empress (1932; uncredited)
 Night Court (1932; writer)
 Torch Singer (1933; screenplay) 
 Such Women Are Dangerous (1934; additional dialogue)
 Evelyn Prentice (1934; writer)
 All Men Are Enemies (1934; writer)
 Four Frightened People (1934; writer)
 Vanessa: Her Love Story (1935; adapted screenplay) 
 Age of Indiscretion (1935; story) 
 The Personal History, Adventures, Experience, & Observation of David Copperfield the Younger (1935; uncredited)
 Suzy (1936; writer)
 White Banners (1938; screenplay)
 Four Daughters (1938; writer)
 Stronger Than Desire (1939; contributing writer; uncredited)
 Four Wives (1939; contributor to treatment; uncredited)
 Good Girls Go to Paris (1939 original story)
 My Son, My Son! (1940; screenplay)
 The Way of All Flesh (1940; writer)
 They Died with Their Boots On (1941; additional dialogue; uncredited)
 The Great Lie (1941; writer) 
 We Were Dancing (1942; contributing writer; uncredited)
 The Gay Sisters (1942; screenplay)
 Old Acquaintance (1943; screenplay) 
 Till We Meet Again (1944; writer)
 Marriage Is a Private Affair (1944; writer)
 Tomorrow Is Forever (1946; writer)
 The Guilt of Janet Ames (1947; story)
 Escape Me Never (1947; uncredited)
 Beyond the Forest (1949; writer)
 Lightning Strikes Twice (1951; writer)
 Sudden Fear (1952; writer)
 Young at Heart (1954; writer)
 Family Portrait (1955; teleplay based on Coffee's 1939 play)
 Footsteps in the Fog (1955; screenplay) 
 Lux Video Theatre "Lightning Strikes Twice" (1955; teleplay)
 The End of the Affair (1955; writer)
 Lux Video Theatre "Old Acquaintance"  (1956; teleplay)
 Lux Video Theatre "The Gay Sisters" (1956; teleplay)
 The 20th Century-Fox Hour "Yacht on the High Sea episode" (1956; teleplay)
 Lux Video Theatre "The Great Lie" (1957; teleplay)
 Another Time, Another Place (1958; screenplay by Stanley Mann, based on Coffee's 1955 novel)
 The Invisible Man "the Mink Coat" (1959; teleplay)
 Cash McCall (1960; writer)

Notes

External links

Lenore Coffee at Women Film Pioneers Project

1896 births
1984 deaths
Screenwriters from California
Writers from San Francisco
People from Greater Los Angeles
American women screenwriters
American women dramatists and playwrights
20th-century American dramatists and playwrights
20th-century American women writers
Women film pioneers
20th-century American screenwriters